The DecimalBrothers (Decimal Brothers) are a web-based comedy duo consisting of two brothers, Homam Nasser and Mollie Nasser. They began posting videos on YouTube in February 2008, obtaining early success with the help of popular YouTuber, Davedays, who has premiered their first video on his YouTube Channel. Actors Ashton Kutcher and Liam Neeson have since posted a video of theirs on their Twitter accounts, gaining them more recognition. They have drawn viewers from some 100 countries, though they are most popular in the United States, the United Kingdom, and the Middle East,. 

Two DecimalBrothers related channels exist on YouTube. The base "DecimalBrothers" channel, where both Homam and Mollie post their skits, and "GreenHatAngel" where they post vlogs and other small projects.

History

Formation 
The Decimal Brothers  have been creating skits since adolescence, eventually deciding to upload them to YouTube to show family and friends. The name "DecimalBrothers" originated as a tribute to Batman. Batman disliked bats, as the DecimalBrothers dislike math considerably.

Personal lives 
Homam and Mollie grew up and currently reside in Michigan.  Their father has a PhD in Biochemistry and their mother is a stay-at-home mom. They have three sisters and one younger brother nicknamed Yoshi. Born in America, they are of Arab descent.

References

American comedy duos